The Furness line is a British railway between  and , joining the West Coast Main Line at . A predominantly passenger line, it serves various towns along the Furness coast, including Barrow-in-Furness, Ulverston and Grange-over-Sands. It runs through Cumbria and Lancashire.

The line was constructed by the Ulverston and Lancaster Railway and the Furness Railway between 1846 and 1857, and today has services operated by Northern.

Along with the Cumbrian Coast Line, the route is considered one of the most scenic in England. The line was designated a community rail partnership by the Department for Transport in 2012. The line is electrified between Lancaster and Carnforth where the route leaves the West Coast Main Line, which previously allowing for sleeper services between Barrow and London Euston.

History 

The line was opened in stages between 1846 and 1857 to link the mineral industries in the area. The area was very isolated before the railway opened, with the only road crossing to reach the area over Morecambe Bay. The Furness Railway was first proposed in November 1843, linking the slate quarries of Kirkby in Furness and iron ore in the Lindal in Furness area to a deep water berth at Roa Island. It was originally intended to be used solely as a mineral railway, however provisions were made for a branch to Barrow and a link to Ulverston, the largest local town at the time.

The line slowly expanded to link up with what is today the Cumbrian Coast Line, in addition to an extension to Ulverston in 1854. In 1857, the Ulverston and Lancaster Railway completed its route, linking to the Carlisle and Lancaster Railway. The line eventually began to expand, purchasing the Whitehaven and Furness Junction Railway. The railway company eventually refused to purchase the Whitehaven Junction railway, leading to a situation where the Furness Railway was heavily influenced by the London and North Western Railway.

The line continued to develop in the 1880s, especially in the Barrow area. A through station was constructed, removing the need to reverse as was the case at the Strand terminus. A passenger station had been opened at Ramsden Dock a year before to connect with the new Isle of Man and later Belfast steamer services.

Early twentieth century
In the early 20th century, passenger numbers had continued to decline. As a result, an effort was made to modernise the line as a tourist railway, linking the country to the Lake District. This began a new era for the area, bringing thousands of tourists to Coniston and Windermere.

Under the Big Four, the line was brought under the control of the London, Midland & Scottish Railway on 31 December 1922. The Roa Island branch was closed in 1936, however the rest of the network remained open until the formation of British Railways. The Coniston branch closed in 1962 and the Lakeside branch in 1965, with part of the route being preserved as the Lakeside and Haverthwaite Railway. Sleeper services to London Euston ceased in 1990.

Modern era
Following the privatisation of British Rail in the 1990s, services were initially transferred to First North Western. First TransPennine Express took over the operation of regional express services to Manchester and Preston in 2004, while local services were transferred to Northern Rail.

Class 37 locomotives hauling Mark 2 carriages were used on the line between May 2015 and May 2018, operating through services along the Cumbrian Coast line due to a shortage in rolling stock following the move of Class 170 'Turbostar' units to Chiltern Railways. The change was controversial locally as the trains were old, and unreliable. Class 68 locomotives were introduced onto services temporarily in January 2018, until through running of loco-hauled stock ended in May 2018.

In April 2016, operation of all services on the line was transferred to Arriva Rail North, with regional and local services again operated by the same train operating company. Services were operated using a variety of Sprinter diesel multiple units and Class 185 'Desiro' units subleased from TransPennine Express until July 2019. In July 2019, new Class 195 'Civity' units were introduced as part of the new franchise, with an increased number of services to Manchester.

Services 
Following a recasting of rail franchises in the North of England by the Department for Transport, all services on the line are now operated by Northern. Regional services to Manchester and Preston were previously operated by First TransPennine Express until 31 March 2016, and TransPennine Express Class 185s used by the previous franchise were used on some services to Manchester Airport by Northern.

The line received a modernised timetable in May 2018, with additional services to Manchester Airport introduced from July 2019. The service is unusual amongst those on the West Coast Main Line as it does not yet have a clockface timetable. This means that there are several gaps in the service, varying between 30 and 90 minutes. The new timetable was criticised by local schools due to the introduction of earlier services between Barrow and Ulverston.

Future
Following a recasting of rail franchises in the North of England by the Department for Transport, all services on the line were transferred to Northern in April 2015. Services previously operated by First TransPennine Express will be operated by new 'Northern Connect' services from December 2019, enhancing the previous service with 11 trains per day to Manchester Airport. The enhanced service will use new, air-conditioned Class 195 'Civity' units and offer free onboard WiFi and faster journey times.

In addition to the introduction of Northern Connect services, an enhanced local service will also be introduced with 21 trains per day (tpd) in both directions, compared to between 18-20 tpd today. Additional services are to be extended from Lancaster to Preston to allow better links to Manchester, Liverpool and other West Coast Main Line services. On Sundays, an enhanced service is planned with up to 5-8 extra trains per day in each direction to both Lancaster and Manchester Airport.

It is also intended to refurbish all stations served by Northern Connect services. These refreshed stations will provide higher standards with free WiFi and modern facilities.

References

Rail transport in Cumbria
Rail transport in Lancashire
Furness
Transport in Barrow-in-Furness
Railway lines in North West England
Railway lines opened in 1846